Convention against Corruption could refer to:
The United Nations Convention against Corruption of the United Nations,  in force since 14 December 2005.
The Inter-American  Convention against Corruption of the Organization of American States, in force since 6 March 1997.
The Civil Law Convention on Corruption of the Council of Europe, adopted 4 November 1999.
The Criminal Law Convention on Corruption of the Council of Europe, adopted 27 January 1999.
The EU Convention against Corruption involving officials of the European Union, adopted on 25 June 1997.
The African Union Convention on Preventing and Combating Corruption, adopted in 2003.
The OECD Anti-Bribery Convention